Norelona pyrenaica is a species of air-breathing land snail, a terrestrial pulmonate gastropod mollusk in the family Elonidae.

Norelona pyrenaica is the type species of the genus Norelona.

Shell description 
The shell is narrowly umbilicated, flattened above, thin, pellucid, olivaceous corneous. The shell has 4½ whorls, that are rather flattened. The last whorl is not descending. The peristome is acute, reflected, white-lipped.

The width of the shell is 17–21 mm. The height of the shell is 9–11 mm.

Anatomy 
This species of snail makes and uses love darts. (Image of reproductive system.)

Distribution 
This species is endemic to the eastern Pyrenees, France. (map of distribution, map 2)

It is also known from Spain since 2007.

References
This article incorporates public domain text from reference 

 Bank, R. A.; Neubert, E. (2017). Checklist of the land and freshwater Gastropoda of Europe. Last update: July 16th, 2017

External links 

Elonidae
Gastropods described in 1805